Dendropsophus marmoratus (the marmorea frog) is a species of frog in the family Hylidae.
It is found in the Amazon rainforest and montane forests in the eastern piedmont, in Bolivia, Brazil, Colombia, Ecuador (Morona Santiago, Napo, Orellana, Pastaza, and Sucumbíos provinces), French Guiana, Guyana, Peru, Suriname, and Venezuela.
Its natural habitats are subtropical or tropical moist lowland forests, intermittent freshwater marshes, and heavily degraded former forest.
"Marmoratus" in Latin means "marble," perhaps referring to the dorsal coloring pattern. It is threatened by habitat loss.

Identification
Coloration It is a medium frog of bronco color with dark mottled brown, green or reddish, English and yellow-orange finger membranes and white belly with black dots. None of the species near Dendropsophus marmoratus has this pattern of coloration, which makes it clearly distinguishable from other sympatric species.

Size The snout–vent length in males averages 35.8 mm (range 29.8–41.5; n = 19), and in females the average is 47.7 mm (range 46.5–49.7; n = 5).

Description The following description is based on Duellman. The snout is round in dorsal and profile view. eardrum present. The outer finger of the hand has a membrane to the base of the disc; the other manual fingers have membranes along about 2/3 of their length. The toes also have membranes at the base of the discs . Males in reproduction lack cornified nuptial excrescences . Scalloped skin folds are present on the outer edges of the feet, forearms and hands. The skin on the back is weakly tuberculated and that of the belly is granular.

Color in life The back varies from greyish-bronze to greenish-bronze and has a black, dark brown, or reddish mottle that generally includes dorsolaterally olive-green areas. In most individuals, there are pairs of large brown or reddish scapular marks. The armpit, groin, and posterior surface of the thighs are yellow-orange with black spots or mottled on the thighs. The anterior surfaces of the thighs are pale yellow-green with black dots. The chin and belly are white or light yellow with black dots; the ventral surfaces of the limbs are dark gray to black. The membranes are orange distally and black proximally. The iris is pale gray with fine black crosslinks.

Habitat and Biology
Dendropsophus marmoratus is an arboreal inhabitant of the forest, but individuals migrate to breeding sites in open areas. About two-thirds of the individuals registered in Santa Cecilia (Sucumbíos Province, Ecuador) were near temporary pools and ditches filled with water in clearings near the forest. A minority were in tree branches in secondary forest and primary forest. On Lago Agrio, frogs were recorded on tree branches felled in primary forest. Many of the frogs had been at heights of more than 20 m. In Yasuni National Park, Ron recorded it in open areas and Read (notes from the field) found choirs of Dendropsophus marmoratusin recently created temporary pools along roads in primary and secondary forest; It was especially common in large clearings within primary forest, such as oil well platforms, where water was present. Scinax ruber males also sing in their choirs.

D. marmoratus is found at altitudes from 0 to 1000 m above sea level in the Amazon Basin in Brazil, Colombia, Ecuador, Peru, Bolivia; the south of Venezuela; the Guyanas. Gomes and Peixoto gave a record for Mato Grosso, Brazil and commented on the Brazilian component of the distribution. The first record in Bolivia is given by Köhler.

Taxonomy and Evolutionary Relationships

Part of the Dendropsophus marmoratus group. The group has eight species of which only Dendropsophus marmoratus is in Ecuador. The phylogeny presented by Wiens et al. supports the monophilia of the group but, its analysis and Faivovich analysis only included two species. Faivovich et al. suggested as a possible character shared by the group (synapomorphy) the presence of tuberculated skin on the margin of the lower lip. See synopsis of Bokermann.

Additional Information

Duellman described the tadpole and provided data on morphology, occurrence, natural history, vocalization and diet in Santa Cecilia, Ecuador. Natural history data of the Amazonian Cusco Peru, are presented by Duellman. Lescure and Marty provided a brief synopsis and photo in French Guiana. Beetles and orthoptera are the most abundant prey  while Menéndez-Guerrero  reports that the diet has a high frequency of ants and attributes this fact to its morphology characterized by short jaws and thin head compared to others hybrids Lee and Crump demonstrate selection of partners in relation to size since males in bridal embrace (amplexus) were on average larger than males who were not in amplexus.

References

Menéndez-Guerrero, P. 2001. Trophic ecology of the anura community of Yasuni National Park in the Ecuadorian Amazon. Bachelor thesis. Pontifical Catholic University of Ecuador. School of Biology Quito PDF
Ron, SR 2001–2011. Amphibians of Yasuni National Park, Ecuadorian Amazon. [online]. see. 1.7 (2011). Zoology Museum, Pontifical Catholic University of Ecuador. Quito, Ecuador.
Laurenti, JN 1768. Specimen medicum, exhibits synopsin reptilium emendatam cum experimentis circa venena et antidota reptilium austracorum, quod authoritate et consensu. Joan. Thomae, Vienna, 217 pp. PDF
Wiens, JJ, Kuczynski, CA, Hua, X. and Moen, DS 2010. An expanded phylogeny of treefrogs (Hylidae) based on nuclear and mitochondrial sequence data. Molecular Phylogenetics and Evolution 55: 871–882. PDF
Faivovich, J., Haddad, CF, García, PC, Frost, DR, Campbell, JA and Wheeler, WC 2005. Systematic review of the frog family Hylidae, with special reference to Hylinae: phylogenetic analysis and taxonomic review. Bulletin of the American Museum of Natural History 294: 1–240. PDF
Duellman, WE 1978. The biology of an equatorial herpetofauna in Amazonian Ecuador. Miscellaneous Publications of the University of Kansas 65: 1–352. PDF
Bokerman, W. 1964. Notes on tree frogs of the Hyla marmorata group with description of new species (Amphibia: Hylidae). Senckenb Biol 45: 243–254.
Frost, DR 2009. Amphibian Species of the World: an Online Reference. Version 5.3. http://research.amnh.org/herpetology/amphibia/index.php. American Museum of Natural History, New York, USA. [Consultation: November 2009] ..
Duellman, WE 2005. Amazon Cusco: The lives of amphibians and reptiles in an Amazonian rainforest. Comstock Publishing Associates, The University of Kansas Lawrence, Kansas, 433 pp.
Lescure, J. and Marty, C. 2000. Atlas des Amphibiens de Guyane. Collect Patrimoines Nat., Paris 45: 138–139.
Lee, JC and Crump, M. 1981. Morphological Correlates of Male Mating Success in Tripiron petastus and Hyla marmorata . Oecology 50: 153–157.
Köhler, J. and Böhme, W. 1996. Anuran amphibians from the region of Pre-Cambrian rock outcrops (inselbergs) in northeastern Bolivia, with a note on the gender of Scinax Wagler, 1830 (Hylidae). Revue Française d'Aquariologie, Herpétologie 23: 133–140.
Gomes, M. d. and Peixoto, OL 2009. Geographic distribution: Dendropsophus marmoratus . Herpetological Review 40: 445.
IUCN 2010. The IUCN red list of threatened species. http://www.iucnredlist.org/apps/redlist/search. (Consulted: 2010).
https://amphibiaweb.org/species/859

marmoratus
Amphibians of Bolivia
Amphibians of Brazil
Amphibians of Colombia
Amphibians of Ecuador
Amphibians of French Guiana
Amphibians of Guyana
Amphibians of Peru
Amphibians of Suriname
Amphibians of Venezuela
Amphibians described in 1768
Taxonomy articles created by Polbot
Taxa named by Josephus Nicolaus Laurenti